1932 was the 39th season of County Championship cricket in England. England played India in a home Test series for the first time and won 1–0. Yorkshire retained the championship.

Honours
County Championship – Yorkshire
Minor Counties Championship – Buckinghamshire
Wisden – Ewart Astill, Freddie Brown, Alec Kennedy, C. K. Nayudu, Bill Voce

Test series

India tour

England played a single Test against India at Lord's Cricket Ground and won by 158 runs.

County Championship

Leading batsmen
Herbert Sutcliffe topped the averages with 3336 runs @ 74.13

Leading bowlers
Harold Larwood topped the averages with 162 wickets @ 12.86

References

Annual reviews
 Wisden Cricketers' Almanack 1933

External links
 CricketArchive – season summary

1932 in English cricket
English cricket seasons in the 20th century